That Summer! is a 1979 British drama film directed by Harley Cokeliss and starring Ray Winstone, Tony London, Emily Moore and Julie Shipley. It was Ray Winstone's theatrical film debut, playing the character Steve Brodie.

Plot
It is the story of a 21-year-old named Steve Brodie (Ray Winstone) who goes to the Devon seaside resort of Torquay after leaving borstal where he is seen easily winning in a swimming race. He befriends the son of a butcher from London named Jimmy (Tony London) and they start dating two girls from Northern England. Steve works in a pub, Jimmy hires skiffs on the beach and the girls are employed as chambermaids at a hotel. Three loutish Scottish youths have some confrontations with Steve and then frame him for a robbery at a chemist shop. This leads to his arrest just before the start of a 'round the bay' swimming race in which he is due to compete against one of them.

Cast
 Ray Winstone – Steve Brodie
 Tony London – Jimmy
 Emily Moore – Carole
 Julie Shipley – Angie
 Andrew Byatt - Georgie
 Jon Morrison – Tam
 Ewan Stewart – Stu
 John Junkin – Mr Swales
 John Judd – Swimming coach
 David Daker – Pub landlord
 Jo Rowbottom – Pub landlady
 Stephanie Cole - Mrs Mainwaring
 Nicholas Donnelly – Detective
 Nick Stringer – Policeman
 Michael Crolla – Barman in Disco
 Colin Higgins – Probation officer
 Ben Howard – Borstal officer
 Michael J. Jackson – Hotel clerk
 David Lloyd Meredith – Beach skiff man
 David Pratt - Coach Driver

Award
Winstone received a BAFTA award as Best Newcomer for his performance in the film and he met his wife-to-be Elaine when shooting it in Torquay.

Music
Songs by new wave groups including  Elvis Costello and The Attractions and the Ramones can be heard in the background during beach and pub scenes and a soundtrack was released on Arista Records. The soundtrack was produced as an LP with several punk bands. The album was available on unique yellow vinyl.

References

External links

1979 films
1979 drama films
British drama films
Films directed by Harley Cokeliss
Films set in Devon
Swimming films
1970s English-language films
1970s British films